Thallada (Thiladri) is a mandal in Khammam district of Telangana, India.

Demographics
According to Indian census, 2001, the demographic details of Tallada mandal is as follows:
 Total Population: 	54,266	in 12,691 Households. 	
 Male Population: 	27,698	and Female Population: 	26,568		
 Children Under 6-years of age: 7,007	(Boys -	3,513	and Girls -	3,494)
 Tallada well known for sandhi vaidyam (it is one of oldest technique) 
 Total Literates: 	26,024

Villages
The villages in Thallada mandal include:
Narayanapuram
Annarugudem
Balapate
Basavapuram
Billupadu
Gollagudem
Gopalapeta
Kalakodima
Kesavapuram
Kodavatimetta
Reddigudem
Kotha Venkatagiri
Kurnavalli
Laxmipuram
Mallaram
Mittapalli
Muddunuru
Nuthankal
Malsoor Thanda
Pinapaka
Ramanujavaram
Rangam Banjar
Rejerla 
Telagavaram
Anjanapuram
Thallada
Muvva Guduru, Vengannapet
Ramachandrapuram)Venkatagiri,

References

Mandals in Khammam district